Official Languages Commission is an Indian commission which was constituted by the president of India in pursuance to the provisions stated in the Article-344 of the Indian Constitution. This commission was constituted on June 7, 1955 vide a notification of the Ministry of Home Affairs, government of India.

Duties of the Commission 
As defined in the Article-344 of the Constitution, it shall be the duty of the Commission to make recommendations to the President as to:
 the progressive use of the Hindi language for the official purposes of the Union; 
 restrictions on the use of the English language for all or any of the official purposes of the Union; 
 the language to be used for all or any of the purposes mentioned in Article 348; 
 the form of numerals to be used for any one or more specified purposes of the Union; 
 any other matter referred to the Commission by the President as regards the official language of the Union and the language for communication between the Union and a State or between one State and another and their use.

Chairman & Members of the joint parliamentary committee, to examine the report of Official language Commission 
As defined in the articles of the Constitution of India, the committee shall consist of thirty members, of whom twenty shall be members of the House of the People and ten shall be members of the Council of States to be elected respectively by the members of the House of the People and the members of the Council of States in accordance with the system of proportional representation by means of the single transferable vote.

See also 

 Languages of India
 List of Indian languages by number of native speakers
 Names of the Indian Constitution in the official languages of India

References

External links 
 Department of Official Language (DOL) – Official webpage explains the chronological events related to Official Languages Act and amendments
 Central Institute of Indian Languages – A comprehensive federal government site that offers complete info on Indian Languages
 Committee of Parliament on Official Languages - Official Website
 Reconciling Linguistic Diversity: The History and the Future of Language Policy in India by Jason Baldridge

Languages of India